is a mountain in Onna Village, Okinawa. The village of Onna was named after the mountain during the Gusuku period.

See also
Onna Nabe

References 

Mountains of Okinawa Prefecture